Puke is the debut EP by the Huntington Beach, California punk rock band Guttermouth, released in 1991 by Dr. Strange Records. It is currently out of print, however all of the tracks were re-issued on the CD re-release of the band's debut album Full Length LP a year later.

Track listing
All songs written by Guttermouth
Side 1
"Chicken Box"
"Just a Fuck"
Side 2
"Hypocrite"
"Marco-Polo"

Performers
Mark Adkins - vocals
Scott Sheldon - guitar
Eric "Derek" Davis - guitar
Clint "Cliff" Weinrich - bass
James Nunn - drums

Album information
Record label: Dr. Strange Records

References

Guttermouth EPs
1991 debut EPs
Dr. Strange Records EPs